Eurogentec is an international biotechnology supplier, based in Belgium, that specializes in genomics and proteomics kits and reagents as well as cGMP biologics. The company was founded in 1985 as a spin-off from the University of Liège. Eurogentec's contract manufacturing organization facilities are licensed by the Belgian Ministry of Health to produce clinical trial and commercial biopharmaceutical material and also licensed by the US FDA to manufacture a commercial recombinant protein product for the US market. Eurogentec operates two manufacturing facilities in Belgium that provide custom biologics and oligonucleotide-based components for diagnostic and therapeutic/prophylactic applications.

History

1985: The company was founded in Liège by two young researchers from the University of Liège, Prof. Joseph Martial and Prof. André Renard. Prof. Joseph Martial crossed the Atlantic at the end of the 1970s to work at University of California, San Francisco in an American laboratory and returned a few years later, as a trained genetic engineer, at a time when these technologies were still largely confined to North America. Above all, he came back with a certain concept of the economic role potentially assumed by a university researcher in creating his own enterprise. At that time, there was no ad hoc structure at the ULg to support the launching of a spin-off. Prof. J. Martial recruited a young researcher (Prof. A. Renard). The laboratory was then welcomed by ULg authorities in their facilities. The company's first goal was to perfect a vaccine for fish breeding through genetic engineering.

1987: Eurogentec started to distribute Oligonucleotides for Research laboratories. The company's first years were difficult but in the very early 1990s, Jean-Pierre Delwart, economist from Brussels University, boarded the ship and put Eurogentec in a favorable current.

1996: Eurogentec became a contract research organization (CRO) for the biopharmaceutical sector and entered into collaboration with SmithKline Beecham biologicals (Rixensart, Belgium) for the production of recombinant proteins for phase I, II and III clinical trials. In addition to its pharmaceutical manufacturing activities, Eurogentec became a service company for the biotechnical research industry and university laboratories.

1999: Eurogentec acquired Oswel Research Product Ltd. a biotechnology company based in Southampton, Great Britain and specialized in the synthesis of chemically modified and complex oligonucleotides and their analogues (DNA, RNA, PNA).

2002: Eurogentec acquired Wita Proteomics, a company specialized in proteomics services, based in Berlin (Germany). A few months later, Eurogentec installed its US office in San Diego for the production of oligonucleotides (EGT NA).

2004: Eurogentec opened its new production laboratories (Oligonucleotides and peptides synthesis) in the Liege Science PARK (Belgium). This intelligent building is also ecological: the building is equipped with a home automation system (lighting without switch) and the heating is produced from a condensation boiler allowing energy savings.

From 2000 to 2008 Eurogentec intensified its services and signed agreements with several companies like Cepheid, Epoch Biosciences, Exiqon, Delphi, In Cell Art.

2007: In order to fully meet the Oligonucleotide in vitro diagnostics stringent manufacturing requirements, Eurogentec expanded its current GMP facility in Liège.

2008: Eurogentec received ISO 13485 Certification for the production and sales of In Vitro Diagnostics (IVD) oligonucleotides in Liège. Two years after EGT NA also received ISO 13485 certification for the Oligonucleotide diagnostics manufacturing.

2009 October, Eurogentec announced the acquisition of AnaSpec, a privately owned proteomics company based in Fremont, USA. Anaspec is a provider of proteomics for life science research; they specialize in peptides synthesis, labelled peptides and antibodies, fluorescent dyes and enzyme activity assays.

2010: Kaneka acquired a majority stake in Eurogentec S.A. Kaneka's products include synthetic resins, resin products, chemicals, foodstuffs, pharmaceuticals, medical devices, electrical raw materials and synthetic fibres.

2012: Start commercial manufacturing of a biopharmaceutical for USA market.

Products and services
Eurogentec has developed three interrelated business units, Life Science Research Products and Services, In Vitro Diagnostics Manufacturing Solutions, and GMP Biomanufacturing.

The life science business unit specializes in genomics, and involves the development of oligonucleotides, DNA polymerases, Real-time qPCR Probes, assay services, and proteomics. The proteomics operations are primarily concerned with custom peptides and antibodies, assay kits and Proprietary Dyes & Quenchers.

The in vitro diagnostics business unit provides technical and project support for contract manufacturing of good manufacturing practice (GMP) Oligonucleotides and Taq DNA polymerases for use in Molecular Diagnostic applications. Manufacturing processes take place in clean rooms.

The GMP BioManufacturing BU, is a full-service Contract Manufacturing Organization (CMO) and offers significant know-how in process development, technology transfer, formulation, scale-up and manufacturing of GMP proteins, protein conjugates, plasmids and bacterial vaccines for pre-clinical, clinical and commercial uses, all according to U.S. Food and Drug Administration (FDA) and EMA requirements.

Products in development
As of September 2014 Eurogentec Biologics was developing a vaccine against bilharziosis called Bilhvax in partnership with INSERM and researchers from the Pasteur Institute; the vaccine candidate was starting Phase III trials at that time.

References

External links
 

Biotechnology companies of Belgium
Companies based in Liège Province
Research support companies
Contract research organizations
Pharmaceutical companies established in 1985
Pharmaceutical companies of Belgium
Liège
Seraing
Biotechnology companies established in 1985
1985 establishments in Belgium